Tursun Uljaboev (formerly Nov) is a jamoat in north-western Tajikistan. It is located in Spitamen District in Sughd Region. The jamoat has a total population of 16,874 (2015). It consists of 4 villages, including Andarsoy.

References

Populated places in Sughd Region
Jamoats of Tajikistan